İrfan Saraloğlu (born 16 September 1962, in Ardeşen-Rize) is a Turkish soccer coach and former player. He is currently an assistant coach at Galatasaray S.K.

Club career
He played for Çaykur Rizespor, Sivasspor, Maltepespor, Erdemir Ereğlispor, Düzcespor, Siirtspor and Keşanspor.

Coaching career
He qualified his A category coaching licence in 1995. He is working for Fenerbahçe S.K. and Fenerbahçe Youth Academy Between 2004-2012. He also worked at West Ham United in 2000. Since 2012 he has been an assistant coach for Okan Buruk who currently manages Galatasaray.

External links 
 Profil on TFF.org

References 

1962 births
Living people
Turkish football managers
Turkish footballers
Çaykur Rizespor footballers
Sivasspor footballers
Fenerbahçe football managers
Association footballers not categorized by position
People from Ardeşen
Galatasaray S.K. (football) non-playing staff